12 Lyncis, abbreviated 12 Lyn, is a triple star system in the constellation Lynx. It is visible to the naked eye as a faint point of light with a combined apparent visual magnitude of 4.87. When seen through a telescope, it can be separated into three stars: two components with magnitudes 5.4 and 6.0 that lie at an angular separation by 1.8″ (as of 1992) and a yellow-hued star of magnitude 7.2 at a separation of 8.6″ (as of 1990). The orbit of the two brighter stars is not known with certainty, but appears to have a period of somewhere around 700 to 900 years. Parallax indicates the system is  light years distant from Earth.

References

A-type main-sequence stars
Triple star systems
Lynx (constellation)
Lyncis, 12
Durchmusterung objects
048250
032438
2470